Fenwick may refer to:

Places

Canada
Fenwick, Nova Scotia, a community
Fenwick, Ontario, a village

United Kingdom
 Fenwick, East Ayrshire, a village
 Fenwick, Kyloe, Northumberland
 Fenwick, Matfen, the location of Fenwick Tower, Northumberland
 Fenwick, South Yorkshire, a village and civil parish

United States
 Fenwick, Connecticut, a borough
 Fenwick, Michigan, an unincorporated community
 Fenwick Settlement, Missouri, an abandoned village
 Fenwick, West Virginia, a census-designated place
 Fenwick Island (Delaware–Maryland), a barrier spit in the Atlantic Ocean
 Fenwick Creek, a tributary of the Salem River in southwestern New Jersey

People 
 Fenwick (surname)
 Fenwick (given name)

Other uses 
 Fenwick baronets
  Fenwick Fishing Rods, a brand of Newell Brands
 Fenwick (department store), a chain of independent department stores in the United Kingdom
 Fenwick Groupe, a French engineering company
 Fenwick High School (disambiguation)
 Fenwick Hall, Johns Island, South Carolina, a house on the US National Register of Historic Places
 Fenwick Pier, Hong Kong
 Fenwick Tower (Halifax), Nova Scotia, Canada
 Fenwick Tower (Northumberland), England
 Fenwick tree, a type of data structure
 Fenwick (statistic), a statistic used in ice hockey, also known as unblocked shot attempts

See also 
 Fenwick & West, a law firm based in Silicon Valley
 Grand Fenwick, a fictional country in Leonard Wibberley's comic novels and two related films
 Bishop Fenwick High School (disambiguation)